WOCL (105.9 FM "Sunny FM") is a commercial radio station, licensed to DeLand, Florida, and serving Greater Orlando and Central Florida.  It is owned by Audacy, Inc., and airs a classic hits radio format, focusing on the hits from the 1980s but with some 70s and 90s titles as well.  The radio studios and offices are on Pembrook Drive in Maitland.

WOCL has an effective radiated power (ERP) of 100,000 watts, the maximum for non-grandfathered FM stations.  The transmitter is on Miller Road in Orange City, Florida.   WOCL can be heard as far away as the Space Coast in Brevard County, and the eastern shores of Central Florida. To the North, the station can be heard up to Jacksonville. Sunny can also be heard as far west as the Nature Coast of Citrus and Hernando Counties. Sunny FM is also one of the few Orlando stations to cover Ocala and parts of Gainesville with a decent signal.

History

Country (1967-1986)
On , the station signed on the air.
It was a country music station with a limited signal. The original call sign was WOOO-FM, which changed to WDLF three years later. It was sold in 1977 and re-branded as WELE-FM as a sister station of WELE 1380 AM in South Daytona, Florida.

Oldies (1986-1999) 
In 1986, the format was shifted to oldies and the call sign changed to WOCL. Initially called "Class 105.9", it was renamed "Cool 105.9" in February 1988.

Rhythmic oldies (1999-2000) 
On April 8, 1999, the oldies format was moved to WSHE at 100.3 and called Cool 100. (That station has since been reformatted to Latin pop and become Rumba 100.3 with new call letters WRUM.) 105.9, meanwhile, was changed to Jammin' Oldies, a fad format at the time, and re-branded Power 105.9.

In 2000, as part of AMFM Media's merger with Clear Channel, WOCL was sold off to Infinity Broadcasting (renamed CBS Radio in 2005). By this time, the Jammin' Oldies format had entered a period of decline.

Alternative rock (2000-2008) 
Between October 31, 2000, and January 4, 2008, the station played alternative rock, known as O-Rock 105.9. Following Clear Channel dropping The Howard Stern Show from its stations across the country (including WTKS-FM in Orlando, WOCL began airing the show in morning drive. 

Two talk shows, The Morning After Show and The Jody & Scott Show were turned into music-only shows in mid-2007.

Classic hits (2008-present)

Without warning, at 9:00 a.m. on January 4, 2008, after playing "Down" by 311, WOCL dismissed its on-air staff and began stunting with Bill Drake's The History of Rock & Roll program. During this time, WOCL's webpage displayed a banner with pictures revolving between country music stars, classical figures such as Beethoven, smooth jazz icons such as Kenny G, and sports icons.

At 12:40 p.m. on January 10, 2008, the station began playing a year-by-year montage of snippets of popular culture (including movies, commercials, and of course, hit music) and news stories covering the years from 1965 to 1989. This montage was similar to the one played by WCBS-FM in New York City when that station relaunched its oldies/classic hits format in July 2007, and almost exactly the same one that would be used by classic hits convert WJMK in Chicago in March 2011. At 1:05:09 p.m., WOCL re-launched with a Classic hits format, branded as Sunny 105-9. It features a playlist and imaging that closely resembles that of WCBS-FM in New York. The first song played on "Sunny 105.9" was "That's The Way I Like It" by the Florida-based group KC and the Sunshine Band.

The shift left WJRR as Orlando's only alternative rock station, although WJRR transitioned back to active rock in 2011 because of panel changes on Nielsen BDS. (Alternative would make two subsequent comebacks on analog Orlando Radio - first at 107.3 FM from June 2014 to February 2016, then on sister station 101.9 WQMP in November 2017.)  O-Rock 105.9 returned as an HD2 channel in April 2008, restoring its modern rock format.

In February 2010, WOCL modified its moniker to 105-9 Sunny FM, focusing on music from 1970 (with a few songs per day from the 1960s) to 1989, with the core being the late 1970s and 1980s, with even some 1990s.

Entercom/Audacy ownership
On February 2, 2017, CBS Radio announced it would merge with Entercom. The merger was approved on November 9, 2017, and was consummated on the 17th.

In 2018, the station changed its slogan to "We Own the 80s", and also updated its logo. The station tweaked its format, dropping all 1960s music, and most music before 1975. The station's playlist is mostly 1980s music with some 1970s and 1990s songs.  In 2020, WOCL adopted the slogan "Nobody Plays More 80s".

On March 30, 2021, Entercom rebranded as Audacy, Inc.

Sometime in fall 2022, the station increased its 70s and 90s output and added some early 2000s music, which was very limited back in the 2010s. By that time, the station quietly tweaked its slogan from "Your home of the 80s" to "Your home of the 70s, 80s, and 90s".

WOCL-HD2
WOCL's former modern rock format "O-Rock" aired on WOCL's HD2 subchannel from 2008 until 2019. That format stayed in place even after sister station WQMP switched to alternative rock in November 2017. A simulcast of New York sports radio station WFAN moved from 105.9 HD3 to 105.9 HD2 to accommodate the playlist overlap of sister alternative rock station WQMP and move of regional Mexican-formatted "Ok 93.5" from WOTW-HD3. In early 2020, Entercom switched the feed of 105.9 HD2 from the WFAN simulcast to the national CBS Sports Radio feed.

WOCL-HD3
WOCL is the current originating station of Regional Mexican-formatted "Ok 93.5", moving from WOTW-HD3. Ok 93.5 is rebroadcast onto FM translator W228DF, heard on 93.5 MHz.

References

Radio forum posting tracking the stunting

External links

OCL
Oldies radio stations in the United States
Classic hits radio stations in the United States
Radio stations established in 1967
1967 establishments in Florida
Audacy, Inc. radio stations